This is a list of municipalities in Georgia which have standing links to local communities in other countries known as "town twinning" (usually in Europe) or "sister cities" (usually in the rest of the world).

A
Abasha
 Jevíčko, Czech Republic

Akhaltsikhe
 Ardahan, Turkey

Akhmeta

 Bilhorod-Dnistrovskyi, Ukraine
 Ialoveni District, Moldova

 Panevėžys District Municipality, Lithuania

B
Batumi

 Ashdod, Israel
 Bari, Italy
 Brest, Belarus
 Burgas, Bulgaria
 Daugavpils, Latvia
 Donetsk, Ukraine
 Kislovodsk, Russia
 Kuşadası, Turkey
 Marbella, Spain
 Nakhchivan, Azerbaijan
 Netanya, Israel
 Ordu, Turkey
 Paphos, Cyprus
 Prague 1 (Prague), Czech Republic
 Nysa, Poland
 Savannah, United States
 Sharm El Sheikh, Egypt
 Ternopil, Ukraine
 Trabzon, Turkey
 Ürümqi, China
 Vanadzor, Armenia
 Volos, Greece
 Wrocław, Poland
 Yalova, Turkey
 Yalta, Ukraine

Borjomi

 Legionowo, Poland
 Madona, Latvia
 Poltava, Ukraine

C
Chiatura

 Birštonas, Lithuania
 Keila, Estonia
 Murgul, Turkey
 Sigulda, Latvia

Chokhatauri
 Pasvalys, Lithuania

G
Gori

 Białystok, Poland
 Kartuzy, Poland
 Lod, Israel
 Melitopol, Ukraine
 Orzysz, Poland
 Pavlohrad, Ukraine
 Priekule, Latvia
 Raciechowice, Poland
 Salacgrīva (Limbaži), Latvia

Gurjaani

 Haradok, Belarus
 Pakruojis, Lithuania
 Piaseczno County, Poland
 Vynnyky, Ukraine

K
Khashuri

 Bauska, Latvia
 Hedemora, Sweden
 Horki, Belarus
 Radviliškis, Lithuania
 Zviahel, Ukraine

Khoni

 Andrychów, Poland
 Boschi Sant'Anna, Italy
 Elista, Russia
 Izium, Ukraine
 Tukums, Latvia

Kobuleti

 Akhtala, Armenia
 Alaverdi, Armenia
 Babruysk, Belarus
 Milicz, Poland
 Myrnohrad, Ukraine
 Narva, Estonia
 Oborniki, Poland
 Palanga, Lithuania
 Piekary Śląskie, Poland
 Priekule, Latvia
 Rivne, Ukraine
 Selçuk, Turkey
 Valga, Estonia
 Yuzhne, Ukraine

Kutaisi

 Ashkelon, Israel
 Columbia, United States
 Dnipro, Ukraine
 Ganja, Azerbaijan
 Gomel, Belarus
 Karşıyaka, Turkey
 Kharkiv, Ukraine
 Laiwu (Jinan), China
 Lviv, Ukraine
 Mykolaiv, Ukraine
 Nanchang, China
 Newport, Wales, United Kingdom
 Poznań, Poland
 Sumy, Ukraine
 Szombathely, Hungary
 Ungheni, Moldova
 Valka, Latvia
 Zhytomyr, Ukraine

Kvareli

 Engure, Latvia
 Plungė, Lithuania

L
Lagodekhi

 Ostrołęka, Poland
 Viļāni, Latvia

Lanchkhuti
 Kupiškis, Lithuania

M
Martvili

 Ardeşen, Turkey
 Boyarka, Ukraine
 Czarnków, Poland
 Jevíčko, Czech Republic
 Odolanów, Poland

Mtskheta

 Fındıklı, Turkey

 Irpin, Ukraine
 Kuldīga, Latvia
 Leuville-sur-Orge, France
 Myrhorod, Ukraine
 Nesebar, Bulgaria
 Pereiaslav, Ukraine
 Ružinov (Bratislava), Slovakia
 Svietlahorsk, Belarus
 Trakai, Lithuania
 Ünye, Turkey
 Vagharshapat, Armenia

O
Ozurgeti

 Boyarka, Ukraine
 Rokiškis, Lithuania

P
Poti

 Berdyansk, Ukraine
 Chornomorsk, Ukraine
 Kiryat Yam, Israel
 LaGrange, United States
 Larnaca, Cyprus
 Nafplio, Greece
 Östhammar, Sweden
 Pazar, Turkey
 Sevastopol, Ukraine
 Shanwei, China
 Yazd, Iran

R
Rustavi

 Akmenė, Lithuania
 Cherkasy, Ukraine
 İnegöl, Turkey
 Ivano-Frankivsk, Ukraine
 Kiruna, Sweden
 Kryvyi Rih, Ukraine
 Łódź, Poland
 Panevėžys, Lithuania
 Płock, Poland
 Sumgait, Azerbaijan
 Zhodzina, Belarus

S
Sagarejo
 Širvintos, Lithuania

Senaki

 Bila Tserkva, Ukraine
 Rakvere, Estonia

T
Tbilisi

 Ankara, Turkey
 Astana, Kazakhstan
 Atlanta, United States
 Baku, Azerbaijan
 Bilbao, Spain
 Bristol, England, United Kingdom
 Bucharest, Romania
 Cairo, Egypt
 Chișinău, Moldova
 Doha, Qatar
 Innsbruck, Austria
 Istanbul, Turkey
 Kraków, Poland
 Kyiv, Ukraine
 Ljubljana, Slovenia
 Lublin, Poland
 Minsk, Belarus
 Nantes, France
 Palermo, Italy
 Saarbrücken, Germany
 Sofia, Bulgaria
 Tehran, Iran
 Vilnius, Lithuania
 Yerevan, Armenia

Telavi

 Anykščiai, Lithuania
 Balta, Ukraine
 Bešeňová, Slovakia
 Biberach an der Riss, Germany
 Hlybokaye, Belarus
 Kėdainiai, Lithuania
 Kletsk, Belarus
 Laoag, Philippines
 Shaki, Azerbaijan
 Talsi, Latvia
 Viljandi, Estonia

Tsqaltubo

 Kirovsk, Ukraine
 Polotsk, Belarus
 Saldus, Latvia
 Truskavets, Ukraine

References

Georgia
Cities in Georgia (country)
Georgia
Georgia (country) geography-related lists
Populated places in Georgia (country)